Yukina Ueda (born 7 February 1998) is a Japanese long-distance runner. She competed in the senior women's race at the 2019 IAAF World Cross Country Championships held in Aarhus, Denmark. She finished in 47th place.

References

External links 
 

Living people
1998 births
Place of birth missing (living people)
Japanese female long-distance runners
Japanese female cross country runners
20th-century Japanese women
21st-century Japanese women